Syagrus smithii is a species of palm tree found in Brazil, Colombia, Ecuador and Peru.

References

smithii
Least concern plants
Trees of Peru
Trees of Colombia
Trees of Ecuador
Trees of Brazil
Taxonomy articles created by Polbot